Songs: Ohia (also known as The Black Album) is the debut studio album by Songs: Ohia. It was released by Secretly Canadian on April 1, 1997.

Track listing
All songs written by Jason Molina. The writings on the cover of the album are not the titles of the songs but are included here in parentheses for completeness.

 "Vanquisher" (Cabwaylingo) – 2:19
 "Oriole" (Crab Orchard) – 3:18
 "(G+T) Constant" (Gauley Bridge) – 2:07
 "Sin & Death" (Blue Jay) – 1:41
 "Citadel" (Tenskwatawa) – 3:04
 "930" (White Sulfur) – 2:48
 "Republic" (Our Republic) – 3:16
 "Texas" (Big Sewell Mt.) – 4:43
 "One" (Cotton Hill) – 1:39
 "Sailor" (Dogwood Gap) – 2:37
 "Fortunate Man" (Little Beaver) – 2:07
 "Runs For It" (Blue Stone) – 2:17
 "Hayfoot" (U.M.W. Pension) – 3:24

The vinyl edition of the album also contains "For You" (Greenbrier) between Dogwood Gap & Little Beaver.

References

External links
 Secretly Canadian press release

1997 debut albums
Jason Molina albums
Secretly Canadian albums